Bergman School District is a public school district in Boone County, Arkansas, United States which serves the cities of Bergman and Zinc along with surrounding unincorporated areas within Boone County.

Schools 
 Bergman High School 
 Bergman Middle School
 Bergman Elementary School

Bergman High School 
Bergman High School serves ninth through twelfth grades.  Based on the 2009-2010 academic year, the total enrollment in the school was 340 and total full-time teachers was 28.70, with a teacher/student ratio of 11.85.

Bergman Middle School 
Bergman Middle School serves fifth through eighth grades.  Based on the 2009-2010 academic year, the total enrollment in the school was 342 and total full-time teachers was 30.70, with a teacher/student ratio of 11.14.

Bergman Elementary School 
Bergman Elementary School serves preschool through fourth grades.  Based on the 2009-2010 academic year, the total enrollment in the school was 439 and total full-time teachers was 28.60, with a teacher/student ratio of 15.35.

Board of Education 
The Bergman School District Board of Education is composed of five elected members. Regular meetings are held monthly.

Staffing
Based on the 2009-2010 academic year, the total full-time staff of the Bergman School District was 170.  The total full-time teachers was 88.  The total number of non-teaching staff (including 4 administrators) was 82.

Demographics
Within the geographic area covered by the Bergman School District, there were 1,099 individuals under the age of 18, during the 2009-2010 academic year.

See also

 List of school districts in Arkansas

References

External links
 Bergman School District web site
 Bergman School District Board of Education
 Bergman School District Board of Education Meeting Minutes
 Boone County School District Reference Map (US Census Bureau, 2010)
 Bergman School District (National Center for Education Statistics)
 2011 Arkansas Legislative Audit for the Bergman School District

School districts in Arkansas
Education in Boone County, Arkansas
Schools in Boone County, Arkansas